Uranophora fenestrata is a moth in the subfamily Arctiinae. It was described by Herbert Druce in 1896. It is found in São Paulo, Brazil.

References

Moths described in 1896
Euchromiina